Ahmed Al-Dosari may refer to:

 Ahmed Fayez Al-Dosari (born 1985), Saudi Arabian long jumper
 Ahmed Khalil Al-Dosari (born 1968), Saudi Arabian association football player